Am Buachaille is a sea stack, or vertical rock formation composed of Torridonian Sandstone,  southwest of Sandwood Bay in the Scottish county of Sutherland.

At least four climbing routes are identified on Am Buachaille which is considered a "famous" sea stack climb and has been called the "most serious of 'the big three' Scottish stacks" and a "truly great stack". The easiest route is graded Hard Very Severe (HVS) and access to the stack involves a  swim at low tide.

The name means "the herdsman" or "the shepherd" in Scottish Gaelic.

References 

Stacks of Scotland
Islands of Sutherland
Landforms of Highland (council area)